The Gongola River is in northeastern Nigeria, the principal tributary of the Benue River.
The upper course of the river as well as most of its tributaries are seasonal streams, but fill rapidly in August and September.
The Gongola rises on the eastern slopes of the Jos Plateau and falls to the Gongola Basin, running northeasterly until Nafada. At one time, the Gongola continued from here in the northeast direction to Lake Chad.
Today it turns south and then southeast until it joins the Hawal River, its main tributary.
The Gongola then runs south to the Benue river, joining it opposite the town of Numan.

The lower reaches of the river are impounded by the Dadin Kowa Dam near Gombe, and lower down by the Kiri Dam.
The river downstream from the dam also narrowed and became less winding, with fewer separate channels.

The Gongola's floodplains are covered with a fertile black alluvial soil. Cotton, peanuts (groundnuts), and sorghum are grown for export to other parts of the country, and millet, beans, cassava (manioc), onions, corn (maize), and rice are also cultivated. The government built the Kiri Dam on the river near Numan to provide irrigation for a sugar plantation. The basin is also used as grazing ground for cattle, goats, sheep, horses, and donkeys.

References

Gongola River
Rivers of Nigeria